Montréal division no. 5 (or Montréal no. 5) was a former provincial electoral district in the Montreal region of Quebec, Canada that elected members to the Legislative Assembly of Quebec.

It was created for the 1890 election from part of Montréal-Ouest electoral district.  Its final election was in 1908.  It disappeared in the 1912 election and its successor electoral district was Montréal–Saint-Georges.

Members of the Legislative Assembly
 John Smythe Hall, Conservative (1890–1897)
 Robert Bickerdike, Liberal (1897–1900)
 Matthew Hutchinson, Liberal (1900–1904)
 Christopher Benfield Carter, Liberal (1904–1906)
 Charles Ernest Gault, Conservative (1907–1912)

References
 Election results (National Assembly)
 Election results (QuebecPolitique.com)

Former provincial electoral districts of Quebec

fr:Montréal no 5